The 1928 Kentucky Wildcats football team represented the University of Kentucky as a member of the Southern Conference (SoCon) during the 1928 college football season. Led by second-year head coach Harry Gamage, the Wildcats compiled an overall record of 4–3–1 with a mark of 2–2–1 in conference play, tying for ninth place in the SoCon. The team finished the season by tying undefeated Tennessee.

Schedule

References

Kentucky
Kentucky Wildcats football seasons
Kentucky Wildcats football